Anapisa metarctioides is a moth of the  family Erebidae. It was described by George Hampson in 1907. It is found in the Democratic Republic of the Congo, Kenya and Uganda.

References

Moths described in 1907
Syntomini
Erebid moths of Africa